Snow White and the Seven Dwarfs is a musical with music by Frank Churchill and Jay Blackton, lyrics by Larry Morey and Joe Cook, and book by Joe Cook. Adapted from Walt Disney Productions' 1937 animated musical film of the same name – which in turn had been based on the classic 1812 German fairy tale by the Brothers Grimm – about a princess banished from her kingdom by her vain stepmother, and she comes to live with seven dwarfs in their woodland home.

First produced in 1969, the show carries much of the film's score over, by Churchill and Morey, along with four new songs by Blackton and Cook. It ran a total of 106 performances.

Productions
The stage adaptation was originally created at The Muny in St. Louis in 1969 and was repeated there in 1972.

A production opened at the Radio City Music Hall on October 18, 1979, and closed a month later, after 38 performances, in order for Radio City to put on the Radio City Christmas Spectacular (went up November 25, 1979, to and closed after 91 performances on January 6, 1980).

Snow White went on a brief tour with stops in Chicago and Washington D.C. and then re-opened on January 11, 1980, and closed after 68 performances on March 9, 1980, a total of 106 performances.

A live video recording was briefly available on VHS and Betamax from Walt Disney Home Video in 1981.

Cast and crew
The show was directed and choreographed by Frank Wagner, produced by Robert F. Jani, executive musical director Donald Pippin, scenery by John William Keck, costumes by Frank Spencer, lighting by Ken Billington, conducted by Don Smith, orchestrations by Philip J. Lang, Queen's presentation music arrangement by Ronald Melrose, masks and animal costumes by Joe Stephen, choral arrangements Jay Blackton, Don Pippen, production stage manager Jeff Hamlin, stage manager Neil Miller, and press by Gifford/Wallace, Deborah Morgenthal.

Cast

Musical numbers
Overture
"Welcome To The Kingdom" - Company
"Queen's Presentation" - Company
"I'm Wishing" - Snow White, Greta, Villagers
"One Song" - Prince Charming
"With a Smile and a Song" - Snow White, Animals
"Whistle While You Work" - Snow White, Animals
"Heigh-Ho" - Seven Dwarfs
"Bluddle-Uddle-Um-Dum (The Washing Song)" - Seven Dwarfs
"Will I Ever See Her Again" - Prince Charming
"The Dwarfs' Yodel Song (The Silly Song)" - Snow White, Seven Dwarfs, Animals
"Someday My Prince Will Come" - Snow White
"Heigh-Ho (Reprise)" - Seven Dwarfs
"Here's The Happy Ending" - Company

References

 "The Best Plays of 1979–1980". Dodd, Mead & Company, 1980, pp. 367–369. .

1969 musicals
Musicals based on animated films
Musicals based on multiple works
Works based on Snow White
Snow White (franchise)
Plays based on fairy tales